Eriocoma hymenoides (common names: Indian ricegrass and sand rice grass) is a cool-season, perennial bunchgrass with narrow, rolled leaf blades. It is native to western North America east of the Cascades from British Columbia and Alberta south to southern California, northeastern Mexico, and Texas.

Description
In the wild, it typically grows 4 to 24 in (10 to 61 cm) tall and 8 to 12 in (20 to 30 cm) wide.

Habitat
E. hymenoides grows in a variety of habitats from desert scrub to ponderosa pine forests.  It can live in sandy to clayey textured soils. . It  can stabilize shifting sand.

Cultivation

Indian ricegrass is an important food wild grazers such as bison, bighorn sheep, elk, mule deer, pronghorns, and jackrabbits.  For some of these species, it is especially vital in late winter, as it produces green shoots earlier than other grasses.  The seeds are heavily consumed by many rodents and birds. Seed caching rodents may enhance seedling survival and long term survival of the plant

Indian ricegrass is preferentially consumed by cattle and is an early casualty of overgrazing. It has been eliminated from many sites throughout its range.

Uses
In the past, the grass was a staple food of Native Americans, especially when the maize crop failed, and for non-agricultural tribes. Seed of the ricegrass was gathered and ground into meal or flour and made into bread. Since 2000, the ricegrass has been cultivated in Montana and marketed under the trade name Montina as a gluten-free grain. The Zuni people used the ground seeds as a staple before the availability of corn.

Symbol
It was officially recognized as the Nevada state grass in 1977, and as the Utah state grass in 1990.

The Utah Section of the Society for Range Management began campaigning for a state grass in the mid-1980s, and after studying many species the field was narrowed to four candidates, Indian ricegrass, bluebunch wheatgrass, galleta grass, and Great Basin wildrye. Indian ricegrass was then selected. The state-grass bill was introduced by Senator Alarik Myrin, a member of the Society, in 1989.

References

Pooideae
Bunchgrasses of North America
Native grasses of California
Flora of North America
Plants described in 1817
Grasses of the United States
Grasses of Canada
Garden plants of North America
Crops originating from the United States
Cereals